Awu, also known as Lope, is a Loloish language of China. Awu is spoken in Luxi, Mile, Luoping, and Shizong counties (Ethnologue). It is closely related to Nisu (Lama 2012).

Northern Awu is a distinct language. Ethnologue lists Northern Awu and Southern Awu as dialects.

YYFC (1983) documents Awu (阿乌) as spoken in Jieyupo, Shemu Village, Dongshan Township (东山公社舍木大队捷雨坡村), Mile County, Yunnan.

References

Loloish languages
Languages of China